The Capt. Thomas Gray House is a historic house in Barnstable, Massachusetts.  The -story wood-frame house was built c. 1875, and is a locally rare example of Stick style design.  It is T-shaped in plan, with varied gables that have applied stickwork decoration, and its windows have boldly stylized pediments.  The property also includes a period barn with cupola.  Its owner, Thomas Gray,  was a prominent local captain of steamships.

The house was listed on the National Register of Historic Places in 1987.

See also
National Register of Historic Places listings in Barnstable County, Massachusetts

References

Houses in Barnstable, Massachusetts
National Register of Historic Places in Barnstable, Massachusetts
Houses on the National Register of Historic Places in Barnstable County, Massachusetts